The granular salamander or ajolote (Ambystoma granulosum) is a species of mole salamander in the family Ambystomatidae. It is found only in Mexico.
Its natural habitats are subtropical or tropical high-altitude grassland, freshwater marshes, intermittent freshwater marshes, and ponds.
It is threatened by habitat loss and overcropping along with the scaling of their skins.

Early life 
Ambystoma granulosum is subject to high mortality rates in early stages of development in nature due to insufficient nutrition and anthropogenic factors such as contamination and habitat degradation. The larvae display distinct changes in feeding patterns with increasing age, preferring smaller prey (e.g., A. glabra) in early larval stages and larger prey (e.g., S. vetulus and D. pulex) in later weeks. Low natural availability of prey in the wild lead to food deficiencies and increased early stage mortality.

Distribution
Its population size is unknown.

References

Mole salamanders
Taxonomy articles created by Polbot
Amphibians described in 1944